
Gmina Stare Babice is a rural gmina (administrative district) in Warsaw West County, Masovian Voivodeship, in east-central Poland.

Villages
Gmina Stare Babice contains the villages and settlements of Babice Nowe, Blizne Jasińskiego, Blizne Łaszczyńskiego, Borzęcin Duży, Borzęcin Mały, Buda, Janów, Klaudyn, Koczargi Nowe, Koczargi Stare, Kwirynów, Latchorzew, Lipków, Lubiczów, Mariew, Stanisławów, Stare Babice, Topolin, Wierzbin, Wojcieszyn, Zalesie, Zielonki-Parcela and Zielonki-Wieś.

Neighbouring gminas
Gmina Stare Babice is bordered by the city of Warsaw and by the gminas of Izabelin, Leszno and Ożarów Mazowiecki.

References

Polish official population figures 2006

Stare Babice
Warsaw West County